George H. Clements (from El Paso, Texas) was the manager of several newspapers including the St. Louis Star, The Milwaukee Sentinel, and The Fourth Estate.

References

American male journalists
20th-century American journalists
Journalists from Texas
People from El Paso, Texas
Year of birth missing
Year of death missing